Al-Maqwa is a part of the Great Burgan area in Kuwait. Kuwait International Airport is located there.

Geography of Kuwait